Skrzydlna is a village the administrative district of Gmina Dobra, within Limanowa County, Lesser Poland Voivodeship, in southern Poland.

The village, dating back to 13th century or earlier, has a 16th-century baroque church and an 18th-century noble mansion.

References

Villages in Limanowa County